Uncle Slam was an American crossover thrash band from Los Angeles, California, formed in 1987. They were influenced by punk rock bands of the 1980s like Suicidal Tendencies (which featured some of the members of Uncle Slam and the Brood), D.R.I., Corrosion of Conformity, Black Flag and the Circle Jerks, as well as heavy metal bands like Black Sabbath, Iron Maiden, Slayer and Motörhead. Many of their songs are about politics, rebel themes, death, pain and violence.

History 

Uncle Slam was formed in 1987 by vocalists and guitarists Jon Nelson, Todd Moyer, bassist John Flitcraft, and former Suicidal Tendencies drummer Amery Smith. Flitcraft quit the band and was replaced by Louiche Mayorga, who previously played bass alongside Smith in Suicidal Tendencies, but also soon left. He was briefly replaced by Bob Heathcote, who would later join Suicidal Tendencies, before Simon Oliver joined. Their first album, Say Uncle, was released in 1988 through Caroline Records. Before the band could work on a follow-up to that album, Oliver left in 1989 and was replaced by Angelo Espino. After Oliver returned in 1991, the band released their second album, Will Work for Food, in 1993 through Restless Records. Smith departed the band the following year and was replaced by another former Suicidal Tendencies member, R. J. Herrera. With the lineup of Moyer, Oliver, and Herrera, the band recorded and released their third and final album, When God Dies, in 1995, released through Medusa Records. The band broke up that same year.

Members

Last line-up
 Todd Moyer – lead guitar and backing vocals (1984–1995)
 Simon Oliver – bass (1987–1989, 1991–1995)
 R. J. Herrera – drums (1994–1995)

Former members
 Jon Nelson – lead vocals and lead guitar (1984–1987) †
 John Flitcraft – bass, backing vocals (1984–1986) †
 Louiche Mayorga – bass (1986–1987)
 Bob Heathcote – bass (1987)
 Angelo Espino – bass (1989–1991)
 Amery Smith – drums and backing vocals (1984–1994)

† = Members who were present when Uncle Slam was known as the Brood.

Timeline

Discography

Studio albums

Demos

References

External links
 Uncle Slam at BNR Metal Pages

Crossover thrash groups
Hardcore punk groups from California
Political music groups
Thrash metal musical groups from California
Musical groups from Los Angeles
Musical groups established in 1984
Musical groups disestablished in 1995